When a worker has an injury, all US states have a structure of laws designed to provide multiple benefits to that injured worker.  These laws are referred to as workers’ compensation and the laws define the benefits, identify all of the parties, and dictate the manner and method for dispensing such benefits. Since every employee, by definition, must work for some employer, when there is a dispute over the benefits or the injury itself, these two primary entities find themselves in conflict within the system.  These controversies are thereafter resolved through either negotiation or trial, and the practice of representing the employer side is referred to as workers’ compensation employer defense.

Examples
The system itself involves billions of dollars in payments per year and involves a broad spectrum of sub-communities of different and often conflicting interests and individuals

For example, the major entities in most US state systems are:
 Judges
 Lawyers (for both sides)
 Hearing Representatives or Hearing Officers
 Insurance company claims examiners
 Third party administrators for self insured employers and their examiners
 Injured workers (employees)
 Employers
 Doctors and various medical providers
 Bill collectors for the doctors and other providers
 Interpreters
 Court reporters
 Photocopy companies
 Private investigators
 Bill reviewers
 Professional reviewers of requests for medical treatment
 Expert witnesses

The attorneys who regularly perform this kind of work do so with such frequency that their practice becomes specialized, and states have endeavored to acknowledge and control this focus by certification or licensing of the practitioners as designated specialists within the field, after appropriate education, time and successful testing has been accomplished.

See also
 Scaffold Law (New York)

External links

Workers' compensation
United States labor law
Types of insurance
Lawyers by type
Legal doctrines and principles